Red Roses for Me is the debut studio album by the London-based band the Pogues, released on 15 October 1984. It was produced by Stan Brennan, who had managed the Nipple Erectors/The Nips and Rocks Off Records shop in London.

Overview
Red Roses for Me is filled with traditional Irish music performed with punk influences. The Mancunion saw the "creativity of post-punk" as being "evident throughout the record", while Muso's Guide described much of Red Roses for Me as "a whirlwind of revved-up folk punk". The band's approach of mixing traditional songs and ballads with frontman Shane MacGowan's "gutter hymns" about drinking, fighting and sex was innovative at the time. The album reached number 89 in the UK album charts.

The front of the album shows the band with the exception of drummer Andrew Ranken (pictured in inset) sitting in front of a picture of US President John F. Kennedy. Accordion player James Fearnley has a bottle sticking out of his coat, while bass player Cait O'Riordan is seen holding a can of beer. The back cover features Shane MacGowan pictured with his foot in a cast.

Critical reception

The UK music press hailed the Pogues' début album as a breath of fresh air, with positive reviews. Melody Maker felt that "the quality of their music, even the very nature of it, is strangely irrelevant. What's important is their existence at all. For The Pogues are a gesture – a particularly bloody two-fingered one – aimed at all things considered current and fashionable in 1984... Theirs is a gut reaction to traditional music – and with it comes all the motion, intensity and vigour that has largely been lost to these songs since the early days of the folk revival in the Sixties." NME stated, "From the strummed banjo and lilting accordion that preface a roaring singalong 'Transmetropolitan' to the final unidentified voice offering an unaccompanied 'diddly I di di' refrain, there exists a wealth of evidence that Shane MacGowan's faith in the power of positive drinking-music has paid premiums. The raucous surge and evocative noise that has filled the capital's pubs and clubs has come through the stark sobriety of the studio set-up to arrive intact in all its sweat-soaked beer-stained glory... If you think they've rehabilitated a music that's been asleep for a while you're dead wrong – on both counts. The music has never been away, and The Pogues in all their irreverent 'seriousness' have taken it out on a limb, where it all started, where it belongs." Awarding the album 3¾ stars out of five, Sounds said, "Red Roses for Me is a satisfyingly impure, purposefully imperfect and totally irresistible collection of lasting resentment, rebellious roars, watery-eyed romance and uproarious jigs... Surprisingly, this record works. It manages to convey the sullied, brazen and raucous spirit of their live set very effectively." Robert Christgau gave the album a B+ and proclaimed "tepid it ain't".

Legacy
For the 1994 reissue of the album Q observed that the album "rushes along at an unholy amphetamine gallop... they sound utterly intoxicated both with their own enthusiasm and the spirit of the jig and the reel".

In a retrospective review for AllMusic, Mark Deming calls the album "good and rowdy fun", but feels that "on Rum Sodomy & the Lash and If I Should Fall from Grace with God, the Pogues would prove that they were capable of a lot more than that".

Track listing

Standard edition 
"Transmetropolitan" (Shane MacGowan) – 4:15
"The Battle of Brisbane" (instrumental) (MacGowan) – 1:49
"The Auld Triangle" (Brendan Behan) – 4:20
"Waxie's Dargle" (Traditional; arranged by The Pogues) – 1:53
"Boys from the County Hell" (MacGowan) – 2:56
"Sea Shanty" (MacGowan) – 2:24
"Dark Streets of London" (MacGowan) – 3:33
"Streams of Whiskey" (MacGowan) – 2:32
"Poor Paddy" (Traditional; arranged by The Pogues) – 3:09
"Dingle Regatta" (instrumental) (Traditional; arranged by Jem Finer) – 2:52
"Greenland Whale Fisheries" (Traditional; arranged by The Pogues) – 2:36
"Down in the Ground Where the Dead Men Go" (MacGowan) – 3:30
"Kitty" (Traditional; arranged by The Pogues) – 4:23

Bonus tracks (2004 reissue)
The first CD issue of the album had a total of 14 tracks, adding "Whiskey You're the Devil" as track 8.

In 2004, a remastered CD was issued adding a total of 6 bonus tracks to the original UK album listing. "Repeal of the Licensing Laws" was the B-side of "The Boys from the County Hell" their second single. "And the Band Played Waltzing Matilda" was the B-side of their first single, "Dark Streets of London". "Whiskey You're the Devil" and "Mursheen Durkin" were the B-sides of their third single, "A Pair of Brown Eyes". "The Wild Rover" and "The Leaving of Liverpool" were the B-sides of their fourth single, "Sally Maclennane".

 "The Leaving of Liverpool" (Traditional; arranged by The Pogues) produced by Elvis Costello
 "Muirshin Durkin" (Traditional; arranged by The Pogues) produced by Philip Chevron
 "Repeal of the Licensing Laws" (instrumental) (Spider Stacy) produced by Stan Brennan
 "And the Band Played Waltzing Matilda" (Eric Bogle) produced by Stan Brennan
 "Whiskey You're the Devil" (Traditional; arranged by The Pogues) produced by Philip Chevron
 "The Wild Rover" (Traditional; arranged by The Pogues) produced by Elvis Costello

Charts

Certifications

Personnel
The Pogues
Shane MacGowan
Country Jem Finer
Spider Stacy
Maestro Jimmy Fearnley
Rocky O'Riordan
Andy "The Clobberer" Ranken

Additional personnel on bonus tracks
Phil Chevron

Technical
Stan Brennan – producer
Nick Robbins – engineer
Craig Thompson –  engineer
Steve Tynan – photography

References

1984 debut albums
The Pogues albums
Stiff Records albums